Lakeside Inn (formerly Tahoe Sky Harbor, Fabulous Eddie's Stardust Club, Caesars Inn and Harvey's Inn) was a hotel and casino located in Stateline, Nevada.

History
The Inn was originally a smaller casino called Caesars Inn, opened in 1969 with five table games and 100 slot machines and operated by Grover L. Rowland, B. A. Stunz, and Herbert Fisher.

In 1972, Harvey A. Gross (owner of Harvey's Resort Hotel along the state line about a mile to the southwest) bought Caesars Inn and surrounding land, including the old Tahoe Sky Harbor airport and casino site to the north (which also housed Fabulous Eddie's Stardust Club in the late 1950s), and expanded the property to include about 130 rooms.

During renovations to the Harvey's Inn in 1973, while workers were welding in the remodeled casino, a fire broke out, heavily damaging the new casino area and motel lobby and resulting in water damage to the restaurant area.

Following the death of Harvey A. Gross, Harvey's Inn was sold in 1985.

On May 24, 1985, Lakeside Inn opened, under president and general manager Rick Jorgenson.

On April 14, 2020, it was announced that Lakeside Inn would close permanently due to the economic impact of the COVID-19 pandemic.

The shuttered casino was purchased in May 2021 by Barton Health for $13 million, with plans to demolish it and build a healthcare facility.

References

External links

 Archived official website for the Lakeside Inn

1946 establishments in Nevada
2020 disestablishments in Nevada
Casino hotels
Casinos in Stateline, Nevada
Defunct casinos in Nevada
Hotel buildings completed in 1946
Hotels established in 1946
Hotels disestablished in 2020
Hotels in Stateline, Nevada
Resorts in Nevada
Defunct hotels in Nevada